Telematch was the name given to a syndicated series of 43 programmes from the West German television series Spiel ohne Grenzen originally broadcast on the WDR (Westdeutscher Rundfunk Köln) channel from 1967 until 1980. It was based on its French counterpart Intervilles and originally consisted of a match between teams from two West German towns, except for the last three years' matches (1978-1980), which were contested between five towns. The match composed of several games in which the participants would typically dress up in costumes. Often the costumes were elaborate and designed to increase the challenge of the game by making movement awkward. Games were played against the clock, or as a race.
Telematch was produced by Transtel. It was dubbed into English, Hindi, Arabic, French, Spanish, and Malay.

It was shown in:
Saudi Arabia, Argentina, China, Colombia, Ghana, Ecuador, Kuwait, Iraq, Egypt, El Salvador, Guatemala, Honduras, Venezuela, Bolivia, Paraguay, Peru, Costa Rica, Cuba, Puerto Rico, Panama, Dominican Republic, Kenya, Nigeria, Middle East, Malaysia, India, Singapore, Sri Lanka, Togo, Turkey and Uruguay as well as in various South East Asian and Caribbean nations and probably other places as well. Although the Spiel ohne Grenzen programme ran from 1967, only 43 episodes were syndicated and transmitted under the title Telematch.

In Spain between 1995 and 2007 TVE broadcast a show like Telematch called El Gran Prix del Verano with the same format.

See also
It's a Knockout
Jeux Sans Frontières

External links

 PDF flyer for the show
 Telematch trailer on YouTube

1970 German television series debuts
1979 German television series endings
German game shows
German-language television shows
Das Erste original programming